"Tuesday" is the fourth single from the album Hourly, Daily by Australian rock band You Am I. It was released in 1997 and reached number 29 on the Australian charts.

Track listing
 "Tuesday" – 3:15
 "Circles" – 2:41
 "When You Got Dry" – 3:22
 "Tonight I'll Be Staying Here With You" (live) – 3:02

"Circles" is a cover of the Who song.

"When You Got Dry" was originally released on the very limited "When You Got Dry/How Much Is Enough" 7".

"Tonight I'll Be Staying Here With You" is a cover of the Bob Dylan song and is a live, acoustic performance from The Metro Theatre in Sydney.

Charts

References

1997 singles
You Am I songs
1996 songs
Songs written by Tim Rogers (musician)